Lars Niklas Sundström (born June 6, 1975) is a Swedish former professional ice hockey player who started his professional career in Modo Hockey. He was drafted eighth overall in the 1993 NHL Entry Draft by the New York Rangers. He was also on Wayne Gretzky's line.  He was not known for his goal scoring ability, but for his defensive play. He was traded to the San Jose Sharks in 1999, and to the Montreal Canadiens in 2003. Sundström plays forward and specializes in defensive roles. When he was a junior player he formed a line in Modo with future NHL stars Peter Forsberg and Markus Näslund. He wore the number 24 for the San Jose Sharks and the New York Rangers but wore the number 37 for the Montreal Canadiens.  After 11 NHL seasons, he returned to play in Sweden at the start of the 2006–07 season, leading Modo to a surprise title during his first season, scoring several vital goals in the playoffs. He formed an effective partnership with Norwegian Per-Åge Skrøder, leading to Skrøder winning the top scorer rankings in 2009. Modo still missed the playoffs that year, despite Sundström having the best plus-minus rating in the entire series. On December 3, 2013, Sundström officially announced his retirement.

Career statistics

Regular season and playoffs

International

References

External links

NHLPA player bio

1975 births
HC Milano players
Ice hockey players at the 1998 Winter Olympics
Ice hockey players at the 2002 Winter Olympics
Living people
Modo Hockey players
Montreal Canadiens players
National Hockey League first-round draft picks
New York Rangers draft picks
New York Rangers players
Olympic ice hockey players of Sweden
People from Örnsköldsvik Municipality
San Jose Sharks players
San Jose Sharks scouts
Sportspeople from Västernorrland County
Swedish ice hockey right wingers
Swedish expatriate sportspeople in Italy
Expatriate ice hockey players in Italy
Swedish expatriate ice hockey players in Canada
Swedish expatriate ice hockey players in the United States